These are the official results of the Women's 200 metres Butterfly event at the 1993 FINA Short Course World Championships held in Palma de Mallorca, Spain.

Finals

Qualifying heats

See also
1992 Women's Olympic Games 200m Butterfly
1993 Women's European LC Championships 200m Butterfly

References
 Results
 swimrankings

B
1993 in women's swimming